Westmoreland was built in 1832 at Lynn. She made three voyages transporting convicts to New South Wales. She was last listed in 1847.

Career
First convict voyage (1835): Captain John Brigstock, with surgeon Charles Inches, sailed from London, England on 9 March 1835, and arrived at Port Jackson on 15 July 1835.  Westmoreland had embarked 220 male convicts and landed 218; two convicts died on the voyage. 

Westmoreland left Port Jackson on 20 August 1835 bound for Portland Bay with a cargo of oil and stores.

Second convict voyage (1836): Captain Brigstock, with surgeon J. Ellis, sailed from Woolwich, England on 12 August 1836, arrived at Hobart Town on 3 December 1836. Westmoreland had embarked 155 female convicts; one convict died on the voyage.  

Westmoreland left Hobart Town on 10 January 1837 bound for Launcestown with a cargo of stores.

Third convict voyage (1838): Captain Brigstock, with surgeon George McLure, sailed from Dublin, Ireland on 27 April 1838, and arrived at Port Jackson on 22 August 1838. Westmoreland had embarked 254 male convicts; four convicts died on the voyage.

Westmoreland left Port Jackson on 10 January 1837 bound for Launcestown with a cargo of stores.

Fate
Westmoreland was last listed in Lloyd's Register in 1847 with Appleton, master, Bottomly, owner, and trade Shields–India.

Citations

References

1832 ships
Ships built in England
Convict ships to New South Wales
Convict ships to Tasmania